Thomas Widdrington (died 1664) was an English politician and judge.

Thomas Widdrington may also refer to:

Thomas Widdrington (died 1660) (1640–1660), English MP for Morpeth
Tommy Widdrington (born 1971), English footballer and football manager

See also
Widdrington (name)